FK Gjøvik-Lyn is a Norwegian football club based in Gjøvik, which was founded on 1 February 1902 as Sportsklubben Thor. They play in the Norwegian Second Division, the third highest division in the Norwegian football league system. Their home ground is Gjøvik Stadion.

The club's honours include winning the 1962 Norwegian Cup. The men's team played in the 3. divisjon in 2008, and in the 2. divisjon as late as in 2007. Ahead of the 2009 season, the first team joined the new team Gjøvik FF.

History
The club was founded on 1 February 1902 as Sportsklubben Thor, but changed its name to Sportsklubben Lyn in 1903. The club had departments for both skiing and speed skating, but these departments left Lyn in 1910 and joined Gjøvik IF together with Gjøvik Skiklubb, Gjøvik Tennisklubb and Gjøvik Turnforening. The club had only their football department left and therefore changed its name to Fotballklubben Lyn. Lyn played its first final in the Norwegian Cup in 1914, but lost the final 2–4 against Frigg.  After World War II, Fotballklubben Lyn changed their name to Sportsklubben Gjøvik-Lyn to distinguish themselves from Lyn from Oslo. Gjøvik-Lyn won the 1962 Norwegian Cup after Vard was defeated 2–0 in the final at Ullevaal Stadion on 28 October 1962. As Norwegian Cup winners, Gjøvik-Lyn qualified for the first round of the 1963–64 European Cup Winners' Cup, where they lost 0–7 on aggregate to cypriot side APOEL.

On 15 April 1993, Gjøvik-Lyn was merged with Gjøvik SK. Ahead of the 2009 season, the first team joined the new team Gjøvik FF.

On 23 September 2013, the club decided to merge with Gjøvik FF and change the club's name to Fotballklubben Gjøvik-Lyn, effecting from 1 January 2014.

European Cup appearances

Recent history
{|class="wikitable"
|-bgcolor="#efefef"
! Season
! Division
! Pos.
! Pl.
! W
! D
! L
! GS
! GA
! P
!Cup
!Notes
|-
|2008
|3. divisjon, 
|align=right| 6
|align=right|22||align=right|9||align=right|6||align=right|7
|align=right|39||align=right|40||align=right|33
|First qualifying round
|
|-
|2009–2013
|align=center colspan=11|Competed as a part of Gjøvik FF
|-
|2014
|2. divisjon, gr. 2
|align=right| 6
|align=right|26||align=right|11||align=right|8||align=right|7
|align=right|39||align=right|28||align=right|41
|Second round
|
|-
|2015
|2. divisjon, gr. 2
|align=right| 7
|align=right|26||align=right|12||align=right|3||align=right|11
|align=right|48||align=right|47||align=right|39
|Third round
|
|-
|2016
|2. divisjon, gr. 2
|align=right bgcolor="#FFCCCC"| 11
|align=right|26||align=right|7||align=right|7||align=right|12
|align=right|27||align=right|44||align=right|28
|Second round
|Relegated
|-
|2017
|3. divisjon, gr. 2
|align=right |7
|align=right|26||align=right|10||align=right|4||align=right|12
|align=right|47||align=right|61||align=right|34
|First round
|
|-
|2018
|3. divisjon, gr. 5
|align=right |7
|align=right|26||align=right|10||align=right|5||align=right|11
|align=right|39||align=right|48||align=right|35
|First qualifying round
|
|-
|2019
|3. divisjon, gr. 5
|align=right |3
|align=right|26||align=right|15||align=right|0||align=right|11
|align=right|63||align=right|50||align=right|45
|First round
|
|-
|2020
|colspan="11"|Season cancelled
|-
|2021
|3. divisjon, gr. 1
|align=right bgcolor=#DDFFDD| 1
|align=right|13||align=right|13||align=right|0||align=right|0
|align=right|49||align=right|9||align=right|39
|Second round
|Promoted
|-
|2022
|2. divisjon, gr. 2
|align=right |5
|align=right|26||align=right|12||align=right|4||align=right|10
|align=right|43||align=right|59||align=right|40
|Third round
|
|}
Source:

Honours
Norwegian Cup: 1962

References

External links 
  Official club site

Association football clubs established in 1902
Football clubs in Norway
Eliteserien clubs
Sport in Gjøvik
1902 establishments in Norway